Cele Ferner Hahn (March 21, 1942 – April 11, 2014) was an American broadcaster and politician who represented the 4th Hampden District in the Massachusetts House of Representatives from 1995–2003. Born in Sioux City, Iowa, Hahn received her bachelor's degree in journalism from University of Iowa. Hahn and her husband Curt owned WNNZ radio in Springfield, Massachusetts. She also edited several newspapers.

Early life
Cele's parents were Arnold and Celia Ferner and she attended public schools in Iowa, including East High School where she edited the school paper.

References

External links
Cele Ferner Hahn-obituary

1942 births
2014 deaths
Republican Party members of the Massachusetts House of Representatives
Politicians from Sioux City, Iowa
People from Westfield, Massachusetts
University of Iowa alumni
Women state legislators in Massachusetts
21st-century American women